Najee Goode (born June 4, 1989) is a former American football linebacker. He played college football at West Virginia and was drafted by the Tampa Bay Buccaneers in the fifth round of the 2012 NFL Draft. He has also played with the Philadelphia Eagles, with whom he won Super Bowl LII.

Early years
Goode attended Benedictine  High  School where he lettered in football and track & field. In football, he was a dual-threat quarterback as well as a linebacker. He was named the Most Valuable Player (MVP) of the Cuyahoga County East-West high school All-star game. In track & field, he won the Division II state championship in the discus throw with a school record of 172’1".

He then attended West Virginia University (WVU) where he majored in industrial engineering. While at West Virginia, in 2011, he tied for fourth on the single season list for tackles-for-loss with 15.

Professional career

Tampa Bay Buccaneers
After being drafted by the Buccaneers, Goode took part in the Buccaneers rookie mini-camp. On May 14, 2012, Buccaneers.com announced Goode had signed a four-year deal to become an official member of the Tampa Bay Buccaneers NFL roster, the same day as college roommate, and Tampa Bay Buccaneers teammate Keith Tandy signed his rookie deal.

He was released on September 1, 2013, when the Buccaneers trimmed their roster to 53 players.

Philadelphia Eagles

Goode was signed to the Philadelphia Eagles on September 2, 2013. On September 9, 2014, he was placed on injured reserve after injuring his pectoral muscle in the season opening win against the Jacksonville Jaguars.

Goode was released by the Eagles on September 5, 2015 for final roster cuts. He was re-signed on September 22. On December 6, 2015, Goode scored his first career touchdown on a blocked punt by Chris Maragos. The Eagles won over the New England Patriots, 35–28. In February 2016 he re-signed with the Eagles. On September 3, 2016, Goode was released by the Eagles during final cuts. On September 10, 2016, he was re-signed by the Eagles.

On March 8, 2017, Goode signed a one-year contract extension with the Eagles. Goode finished the 2017 season with 22 tackles and won Super Bowl LII when the Eagles defeated the New England Patriots 41–33. He had two tackles in the game.

Indianapolis Colts
On April 4, 2018, Goode signed with the Indianapolis Colts.

Jacksonville Jaguars
On May 1, 2019, Goode signed with the Jacksonville Jaguars. He played in 10 games before being placed on injured reserve on November 26, 2019. He finished the season with a career-high 27 tackles, one sack, and two passes defensed.

Indianapolis Colts (second stint)
On October 8, 2020, Goode was signed to the Indianapolis Colts practice squad. He was released on October 27.

Career statistics

Personal life
He is the son of Fatimah and John Goode. Goode had a daughter born in June 2016.
He was married on July 6, 2019 on Jekyll Island, Georgia

References

External links
 
 Philadelphia Eagles bio
 West Virginia Mountaineers bio

1989 births
Living people
Players of American football from Cleveland
American football linebackers
West Virginia Mountaineers football players
Tampa Bay Buccaneers players
Philadelphia Eagles players
Indianapolis Colts players
Jacksonville Jaguars players